The 1912 United States presidential election in Virginia took place on November 5, 1912. Voters chose 12 representatives, or electors to the Electoral College, who voted for president and vice president.

Virginia voted for the Democratic nominee, New Jersey Governor Woodrow Wilson, over the Republican nominee, incumbent President William Howard Taft, and the Progressive nominee, former President Theodore Roosevelt. Wilson ultimately won the national election with 41.84% of the vote. , this is the last election in which Floyd County did not vote for the Republican candidate.

Results

Results by county

Notes

References

Virginia
1912
1912 Virginia elections